Aleksey Vladimirovich Filipets (born 18 August 1978) is a retired Russian swimmer. He specialized in the 1500 m freestyle, in which he won a bronze medal at the 2001 World Aquatics Championships and a silver medal at the European Short Course Swimming Championships 2001. He finished fourth and 19th in the same event at the 2000 and 2004 Summer Olympics, respectively.

He graduated from the Kuban State University of Physical Education, Sport and Tourism in  Krasnodar.

References

1978 births
Swimmers at the 2000 Summer Olympics
Swimmers at the 2004 Summer Olympics
Living people
Olympic swimmers of Russia
Russian male freestyle swimmers
Russian male swimmers
World Aquatics Championships medalists in swimming
Goodwill Games medalists in swimming
Competitors at the 2001 Goodwill Games
People from Novocherkassk
Sportspeople from Rostov Oblast
20th-century Russian people
21st-century Russian people